Library Associations in India
Indian Association of Special Libraries and Information Centres
Indian Library Association
Andhra Pradesh Library Association
Kerala Library Association
Central Government Library Association (CGLA)   
Indian Association of Teachers of Library and Information Science (IATLIS) 
Raja Rammohun Roy Library Foundation    
Society for Advancement of Library & Information Science     
Assam Library Association    
Bengal Library Association     
Delhi Library Association

See also

india